The Netherlands first competed at the Summer Olympic Games at the 1900 Summer Olympics in Paris, France.

Medalists

Additionally Netherlands competitors won gold medals in Rowing for the Mixed Team. In the final Netherlands team switch coxswains to unknown French boy to reduce weight.

Results by event

Aquatics

Swimming

The Netherlands had 4 swimmers compete in 1900. Drost won a bronze medal; two others made their event finals but did not medal.

Archery

6 Dutch archers competed in the first Olympic archery competition.  The Netherlands did not win any medals in the competition.  None of the names of the Dutch archers are known.  They competed only in the Sur la Perche à la Herse and Sur la Perche à la Pyramide events, though whether all six competed in both or if any or all competed in only one is also unknown.

Fencing

The Netherlands first competed in fencing at the Olympics in the sport's second appearance.  The nation sent one fencer.

Rowing

The Netherlands had 3 boats, all from the Minerva Amsterdam club, compete in the first Olympic rowing competitions. They won 1 medal of each color. Because the unknown cox in the coxed pair final was a French boy, the gold medal is often credited as a mixed team medal rather than a Dutch one.

Sailing

The Dutch had one boat in the first Olympic sailing competition. The Dutch team competed in both races of the 3–10 ton class, winning silver and taking 4th. They also competed in the open class, but did not finish.

Shooting

The Netherlands' first Olympic appearance included competing in the shooting events.  Dutch shooters competed in the military pistol and military rifle sets of events.

References

 Hermanus Brockmann in coxed pairs rowing competition was the coxswain for the semifinals, but not for the finals. The name of the French boy the Dutch team employed as a coxswain for the final is unknown.  The medal therefore was not awarded to the Netherlands, but to a Mixed team (ZZX).

Nations at the 1900 Summer Olympics
1900
Olympics